A Carthaginian peace is the imposition of a very brutal "peace" intended to permanently cripple the losing side. The term derives from the peace terms imposed on the Carthaginian Empire by the Roman Republic following the Punic Wars. After the Second Punic War, Carthage lost all its colonies, was forced to demilitarize, paid a constant tribute to Rome and was barred from waging war without Rome's permission. At the end of the Third Punic War, the Romans systematically burned Carthage to the ground and enslaved its population.

Origin
The term was popularized by the 20th century economist John Maynard Keynes.

The term refers to the outcome of a series of wars between Rome and the Phoenician city of Carthage, known as the Punic Wars. The two empires fought three separate wars against each other, beginning in 264 BC and ending in 146 BC.

At the end of the Third Punic War, the Romans laid siege to Carthage. When they took the city, they killed most of the inhabitants, sold the rest into slavery, and destroyed the entire city. There is no ancient evidence for modern accounts that the Romans sowed the ground with salt.

By extension, a Carthaginian peace can refer to any brutal peace treaty demanding total subjugation of the defeated side.

Modern use
Modern use of the term is often extended to any peace settlement in which the peace terms are overly harsh and designed to accentuate and perpetuate the inferiority of the loser. Thus, after World War I, many (the economist John Maynard Keynes among them) described the so-called peace brought about by the Treaty of Versailles as a "Carthaginian peace."

The Morgenthau Plan put forward after World War II has also been described as a Carthaginian peace, as it advocated the deindustrialization of Germany. It was intended to severely curb the influence of German power in the region and to prevent its remilitarization, as had occurred after World War I (German rearmament and the Remilitarization of the Rhineland).  The Morgenthau Plan was dropped in favor of the Marshall Plan (1948–1952), which entailed the rebuilding of Western European infrastructure, particularly in West Germany. 

General Lucius D. Clay, a deputy to General Dwight D. Eisenhower and, in 1945, Military Governor of the U.S. Occupation Zone in Germany, would later remark that "there was no doubt that JCS 1067 contemplated the Carthaginian peace which dominated our operations in Germany during the early months of occupation. This is while the US was following the Morgenthau Plan." Clay would later replace Eisenhower as governor and as commander-in-chief in Europe. The Marshall Plan was favored as a revival of the West German economy was considered to be necessary for the recovery of the economy of Europe. West Germany was regarded as a key bulwark against the Eastern Bloc.

See also
 Debellatio
 Scorched earth
 Victor's justice
 Carthago delenda est
 Pyrrhic victory

References

Bibliography
 

Political terminology
Third Punic War
Peace
Abuse
Cruelty
Metaphors referring to places
Metaphors referring to war and violence